Edvin Kurtulus (born 5 March 2000) is a Swedish professional footballer who plays as a centre-back or right-back for Hammarby IF in Allsvenskan and the Sweden national team.

Club career

Halmstads BK
At the age of five, Kurtulus started to play football with local club Halmstads BK. In 2018 and 2019, as a youth player, he went on trial with both Fenerbahçe in Turkey and Copenhagen in Denmark.

On 20 December 2018, Kurtulus signed his first professional contract with Halmstad. On 5 May 2019, he made his debut in Superettan, Sweden's second tier, in a 0–1 loss to Östers IF. After impressing manager Magnus Haglund, Kurtulus ended the season making 11 league appearances, of which he started ten, mostly as a right-back.

In 2020, Kurtulus continued as a starter for Halmstad when the club won Superettan and secured a promotion to Allsvenskan. He made 18 league appearances in total, mostly playing as a centre-back, before his season was cut short in September when he was diagnosed with pericarditis.

In 2021, Kurtulus was a key player for Halmstad in Allsvenskan, playing 29 league games. The club eventually suffered from a relegation after losing to Helsingborgs IF with 1–3 on aggregate in the relegation play-offs.

Hammarby IF
On 12 August 2021, Kurtulus signed a three-year deal with fellow Allsvenskan club Hammarby IF, effective in January 2022. On 20 February 2022, he made his debut with Hammarby in the 2021–22 Svenska Cupen group stage against Falkenbergs FF after coming on as a substitute at 62nd minute in place of Simon Sandberg. His league debut with Hammarby came on 2 April in a 2–1 home win against Helsingborgs IF after coming on as a substitute at 83rd minute in place of Richard Magyar. Seven days after league debut, Kurtulus scored his first goal for Hammarby in his fifth appearance for the club in a 1–5 away win over GIF Sundsvall in Allsvenskan. Kurtulus featured in the final of the 2021–22 Svenska Cupen, in which Hammarby lost by 4–5 on penalties to Malmö FF after the game ended in a 0–0 draw. In total, Kurtulus went on to make 27 league appearances for the club, that finished 3rd in the 2022 Allsvenskan table.

On 17 February 2023, Kurtulus signed a new three-year contract with Hammarby.

International career

Kosovo

Under-21
On 29 August 2020, Kurtulus received a call-up from Kosovo U21 for the 2021 UEFA European Under-21 Championship qualification match against England U21, and made his debut in the 0–6 loss after being named in the starting line-up.

Senior
On 23 May 2022, Kurtulus received a call-up from Kosovo for the 2022–23 UEFA Nations League matches against Cyprus, Greece (twice) and Northern Ireland. Four days later, the Football Federation of Kosovo confirmed through a press conference that Kurtulus will not be part of the team after deciding to represent Sweden national team.

Sweden
On 30 May 2022, the Swedish Football Association announced that FIFA had given Kurtulus permission to play for their national team and that he had been called-up to replace the injured Victor Lindelöf and Martin Olsson for the 2022–23 UEFA Nations League matches against Slovenia, Norway (twice) and Serbia. His debut with Sweden came on 9 June in the 2022–23 UEFA Nations League match against Serbia after coming on as a substitute at 42nd minute in place of Joakim Nilsson.

Personal life
Kurtulus was born in Halmstad, Sweden to parents with roots from Prizren. His grandparents had emigrated as muhaxhir to Turkey where they took the surname Kurtuluş (meaning "liberation" in Turkish) due to the Turkish surname law. In the 1960s, Kurtulus' family migrated to Sweden, where Edvin's father was born.

Career statistics

Club

International

References

External links

2000 births
Living people
Sportspeople from Halmstad
Sportspeople from Halland County
Swedish men's footballers
Sweden international footballers
Swedish people of Kosovan descent
Swedish people of Turkish descent
Kosovan men's footballers
Kosovo under-21 international footballers
Kosovan people of Turkish descent
Turkish footballers
Turkish people of Kosovan descent
Association football fullbacks
Superettan players
Allsvenskan players
Halmstads BK players
Hammarby Fotboll players